Vivo was a short-lived Japanese photographic cooperative.

Eikoh Hosoe, Kikuji Kawada, Ikkō Narahara, Akira Satō, Akira Tanno, and Shōmei Tōmatsu — six of the participants of the celebrated 1957 exhibition Jūnin no me (Eyes of ten) — formed the Vivo cooperative in July 1957, naming it after the Esperanto word for "life." They shared an office and darkroom in Higashi Ginza (Tokyo), marketing and distributing their own work. Kōtarō Iizawa terms their office "the epicenter of the 'image generation's' photographic expression," and the members' activities "a prime example" of the way Japanese photographers of the time "confronted head-on the transformation of modern Japanese society."

The group disbanded in June 1961.

Retrospectives have included a major exhibition at the Shadai Gallery.

Notes

References

 Nihon shashinka jiten (328 Outstanding Japanese Photographers). Kyoto: Tankōsha, 2000. . P. 348.
Tucker, Anne Wilkes, et al. The History of Japanese Photography. New Haven: Yale University Press, 2003. . Pp. 217–20, 376.

1957 establishments in Japan
1961 disestablishments in Japan
Cooperatives in Japan
Artist cooperatives
Japanese photography organizations
Former cooperatives